Patrick Galbraith and Kelly Jones were the defending champions, but did not participate together this year.  Galbraith partnered Todd Witsken, losing in the quarterfinals.  Jones partnered Rick Leach, losing in the first round.

Tom Nijssen and Cyril Suk won the title, defeating Steve DeVries and David Macpherson 7–6, 6–3 in the final.

Seeds

  Patrick Galbraith /  Todd Witsken (quarterfinals)
  Luke Jensen /  Laurie Warder (semifinals)
  Kelly Jones /  Rick Leach (first round)
  Neil Broad /  Danie Visser (quarterfinals)

Draw

Draw

External links
Draw

1991 ATP Tour